HMS Harpham was one of 93 ships of the  of inshore minesweepers. She was built in 1954 by the Jones Shipyard in Buckie, Moray. She was sold to Libya in 1962 and renamed Brak. She remained in Libyan service until she was broken up in 1973.

Their names were all chosen from villages ending in -ham. The minesweeper was named after Harpham in the East Riding of Yorkshire.

References

Blackman, R.V.B. ed. Jane's Fighting Ships (1953)

Ham-class minesweepers
Ships built in Scotland
1954 ships
Cold War minesweepers of the United Kingdom
Royal Navy ship names
Ham-class minesweepers of the Libyan Navy